Hrvatski Nogometni Klub Brotnjo is a football club based in Čitluk, Bosnia and Herzegovina. The club plays in Second League of the Federation of Bosnia and Herzegovina. Brotnjo plays out of Bare Stadium, which has a capacity of 8,000.

The biggest success came in 2000. when they won the Bosnian-Herzegovinian play-off competition. That's the club's only championship title which secured them presence in the Champions League first qualifying round. Club lost first match 4:0 against Fbk Kaunas. In second game Brotnjo won 3:0. A year later, they also played in UEFA Cup qualifying round.

Logos
The club's crest features the Coat of Arms of Croatia. The name 'Brotnjo' comes from the historical name of the region of Čitluk.

European record

Club seasons

Honours

Domestic

League
Premier League of Bosnia and Herzegovina:
Winners (1): 1999–2000
Runners-up (1): 2000–01

Cups
Supercup of Bosnia and Herzegovina:
Runners-up (1): 2000
Herzeg-Bosnia Cup:
Winners (1): 1998–99

Notable players
For the list of former and current players with Wikipedia article, please see :Category:NK Brotnjo players.
Had senior international caps for their respective countries. Players whose name is listed in bold represented their countries while playing for Brotnjo.

  Dragan Blatnjak
  Mateo Sušić
  Enes Mešanović
  Dalibor Šilić
  Igor Jančevski
  Zajko Zeba
  Miro Klaić
  Miro Katić
  Danijel Krivić
   Mario Ivanković
  Nikola Juričić
  Darko Cvijanović
  Nenad Džidić
  Jovan "Jovo" Sikima
  Robert Miloš
  Miroslav Lauš
  Danijel Bajkuša
  Zoran Prusina

Historical list of coaches

  Srećko Lušić
 Blaž Slišković (1999–2000)
 Ivo Ištuk (2000–2001)
 Marijo Tot (2003–2004)
 Ratko Ninković (2006–2007)
 Davor Juričić-Šojka (2009–2010)
 Romeo Šapina (2014–2017)
 Nikola Juričić (2016–2018)
 Davor Juričić-Šojka (2018-)

References

NK Brotnjo
Association football clubs established in 1955
Football clubs in Bosnia and Herzegovina
Croatian football clubs in Bosnia and Herzegovina
Sport in the Federation of Bosnia and Herzegovina
Čitluk, Bosnia and Herzegovina
1955 establishments in Bosnia and Herzegovina